Jeffrey Frank Smith (born 27 March 1966) is a British auto racing driver and businessman. He is the owner of Industrial Control Distributors and Eurotech Racing, who he previously drove for in the British Touring Car Championship.

Racing career

Renault Clio Cup UK
Born in Coventry, Smith entered the Renault Clio Cup UK championship in 2008, competing in all but two events. He continued in 2009 with a best result of 9th in the final race of the season at Brands Hatch. In 2010 he competed in all races except the rounds at Knockhill, where he raced in the British Touring Car Championship instead. Smith returned to the Clio Cup at Silverstone where he scored his best finish of 4th, but did not race in the season finale at Brands Hatch, and finished the season 8th overall.

British Touring Car Championship

Triple 8 Race Engineering (2010)
Smith competed in three rounds of the British Touring Car Championship in 2010 at Knockhill, driving a Vauxhall Vectra for Uniq Racing with Triple Eight, where he finished 12th, 13th and 10th.

Eurotech Racing (2011–2013, 2015–)
In December 2010 Smith was confirmed as a driver for Eurotech Racing, under the Pirtek Racing banner, in 2011. He raced the entire 2011 British Touring Car Championship season for the team. At Oulton Park he was fined £500, given a reprimand and an endorsement of three points on his racing licence for an incident which saw him collide with Tom Boardman in race one. He finished the season 18th in the Drivers Championship.

In 2012 he raced an NGTC Honda Civic for Pirtek Racing. He started on pole position for the reverse grid race at Donington Park but finished fifth having had a slow start and losing the lead before the first corner. He took his first podium finish in the series at Knockhill with a second place finish in race three. In the wet conditions of race three at Rockingham, he lost control of the back of his car on the high speed banking and spun into the concrete wall. He escaped unhurt but the car was severely damaged at the rear. His car was re–shelled before the next round at Silverstone.

He stayed with Pirtek Racing in 2013. He took a further podium finish at the season-opener at Brands Hatch, but slipped to fourteenth position in the championship after missing several races in the second half of the season.

Smith missed the 2014 season due to business commitments, but returned to the championship for 2015 by buying the Eurotech team, following the departure of lead driver Andrew Jordan and his father Mike as team principal. He is competing as an owner-driver alongside Martin Depper.

In the first race of the 2017 season, Smith took his maiden pole at the Brands Hatch Indy round, the opening round of the season, as qualifying was interrupted by rain and red flags. During qualifying at Croft Circuit, Smith was involved in a multiple car pile-up, causing chest and shoulder injuries, which put an end to his season. He was replaced for the rest of the season by his son, Brett Smith.

Ahead of the 2018 season, it was announced that due to the severity of Smith's shoulder injury, he would also miss the 2018 season, but is expected to make a full recovery.

Superstars Series
Smith joined the Superstars Series for the Circuit de Spa-Francorchamps round of the 2012 season, driving a Team Dinamic BMW M3 (E92). His best result of the weekend was seventh in race two, with both races having taken place in wet conditions.

British Endurance Championship
In 2013 it was announced Smith would be racing for BPM Racing in the British Endurance Championship in a Renault Megane V6 Trophy car.

Personal life
Smith's son, Brett, is also a racing driver, currently competing in the BTCC with the family run Eurotech Racing team.
Jeff's partner is Jo Polley daughter of George Polley.

Racing record

Complete British Touring Car Championship results
(key) (Races in bold indicate pole position – 1 point awarded just in first race; races in italics indicate fastest lap – 1 point awarded all races; * signifies that driver lead race for at least one lap – 1 point given all races)

Complete International Superstars Series results
(key)

Complete British GT Championship results
(key)

References

External links
 Career statistics at btcc.net

1966 births
Living people
English racing drivers
British Touring Car Championship drivers
Superstars Series drivers
British GT Championship drivers
Auto racing executives
20th-century English businesspeople
21st-century English businesspeople
Renault UK Clio Cup drivers
Mini Challenge UK drivers
24H Series drivers